Bernard Bolender (September 1, 1952 – July 18, 1995) was an American mass murderer who killed four people during a drug deal in Florida.

Early life 
Bolender attended high school in West Babylon N Y. After owning a nightclub and restaurant in the 1970s, Bolender separated from his wife and children and became involved in the Miami cocaine scene. He became rich very quickly, reportedly hiring a chauffeured limousine to drive his monkey around.

Murders 
In 1980, Bolender murdered four men after a botched drug deal. Bolender and two others, Joseph Macker and Paul Thompson, kidnapped the four victims and then robbed, tortured, and murdered them. The bodies were hidden in a burnt car which was later found on Interstate 95 in Miami, Florida. The victims were John Merino, Scott Bennett, Rudolfo Ayan, and Nicomedes Hernandez, who were all killed on January 8, 1980.

Bolender, Macker, and Thompson were instant suspects. Macker made a deal with prosecutors for leniency in exchange for his testimony that Bolender was the instigator of the murders. Bolender's fingerprints were found on the burnt car. Despite this, he maintained his innocence and claimed he was not involved in the murders. Bolender stated that he was at home with his girlfriend during the killings.

Trial and execution 
Bolender was convicted of the murders and sentenced to death in April 1980, just three months after the crime. Bolender's case was then appealed to the Supreme Court of Florida, which affirmed his sentence in 1983. A judge threw out his death sentence, ruling that Bolender's lawyer was ineffective as he presented no evidence in Bolender’s favor during the penalty phase of his trial. That ruling was reversed and the death penalty reinstated in 1987. Bolender then had another appeal for the United States District Court for the Southern District of Florida in 1990.

Bolender was executed in the electric chair on July 18, 1995, in Bradford County, Florida. He was pronounced dead at 10:19 a.m. He was executed at the Florida State Prison.

See also 
 Capital punishment in Florida
 Capital punishment in the United States
 List of people executed in Florida

References 

1952 births
1995 deaths
American mass murderers
American people executed for murder
People convicted of murder by Florida
People executed by Florida by electric chair
20th-century American criminals
20th-century executions by Florida
American restaurateurs
Executed mass murderers